is a Japanese professional footballer who plays as an attacking midfielder for  club Hokkaido Consadole Sapporo.

His elder brother Takuma is also a professional footballer, currently playing for VfL Bochum and the Japan national football team.

Career
On 16 August 2019 Asano was signed by Sanfrecce Hiroshima and was immediately loaned back out to Mito HollyHock until 31 January 2020.

References

External links

1997 births
Living people
Japanese footballers
Association football midfielders
Mito HollyHock players
Sanfrecce Hiroshima players
Hokkaido Consadole Sapporo players
J2 League players
J1 League players